The cycling competitions of the 2016 Summer Olympics in Rio de Janeiro were held at four venues scheduled to host Eighteen events between 6 August and 21 August.

The venues were Fort Copacabana in the Copacabana venues were in Clusters for the start and finish of the road cycling road race, Pontal in the Barra Cluster for the road cycling time trial competitions, the Rio Olympic Velodrome, also in the Barra Cluster for track cycling, the Olympic BMX Center for BMX and the Mountain Bike Centre for mountain biking, both in the Deodoro Cluster.

Cycling competitions had been contested in every Summer Olympics programme since the first modern Olympiad in 1896 alongside athletics, artistic gymnastics, fencing and swimming.

Since the 1896 contests which featured five track events and an 87 km road race from Athens to Marathon and back, Olympic cycling had gradually evolved to include women's competitions, mountain bike and BMX to arrive at the current eighteen events.

In February 2013, the International Cycling Union (UCI) announced its intention to petition the IOC to extend the cycling programme by three events for both men and women: the return of the points races (track event), a BMX freestyle event and a mountain bike eliminator but in August 2013 the IOC stated that the cycling programme will be the same as in 2012. No changes were made to the 2016 Olympic cycling programme compared to the cycling at the 2012 Olympics.

Venues

Qualification

Participation

Participating nations
Brazil, as the host country, receives guaranteed quota place in case it would not qualify any qualification places.

Competition schedule

<noinclude>

Medalists

Medal table

Road cycling

Track cycling

Men's

Women's

Mountain biking

BMX

Broken records

At least one record in track cycling was set, the women's team pursuit Olympic record. After the 2012–13 track cycling season the UCI changed the women's 3000 metre team pursuit discipline for 3 riders into a format of 4000 metre with 4 riders.

Cycling track

In addition to the event records, Great Britain's Jason Kenny matched compatriate Chris Hoy as the most successful male cyclist in Olympic history, with six gold medals and a silver over three Games.

See also

Cycling at the 2016 Summer Paralympics

References

External links

 
 
 
 
 
 Results Book – Cycling BMX
 Results Book – Cycling Mountain Bike
 Results Book – Cycling Road
 Results Book – Cycling Track

 
2016 Summer Olympics events
2016
Olympics
Olympics